Coolin' Off is the first studio album by the jazz funk band Galactic. It was released in 1996 on Fog City Records.

Track listing
All tracks by Galactic

"Go Go" – 3:02
"Welcome to New Orleans" – 0:14
"Something's Wrong With This Picture" – 5:56
"Funky Bird" – 4:57
"Stax Jam" – 3:10
"Church" – 5:54
"On the One" – 5:29
"Mystery Tube" – 2:35
"Doo Rag" – 6:16
"Percussion Interlude" – 0:51
"Everybody Wants Some, Pt. 1" – 4:19
"Everybody Wants Some, Pt. 2" – 2:24
"Everybody Wants Some, Pt. 3" – 5:12
"Goodnight" – 3:53

Personnel

Theryl DeClouet - vocals
Erik Jekabson - trumpet
Robert Mercurio - bass, photography
Stanton Moore - drums
Mark Mullins - trombone
Jeff Raines - guitar
Eric Traub - tenor saxophone
Dan Prothero - programming, producer, engineer, editing, design, mixing
Raymond Pumilia - photography
Rich Vogel - keyboards

References

External links
 Official Galactic site

1996 debut albums
Galactic albums
Fog City Records albums
Capricorn Records albums